This article lists the characters from the Japanese visual novel and anime series Otome wa Boku ni Koishiteru, and its sequels.

Otome wa Boku ni Koishiteru

Main characters

 (video game), Yui Horie (anime)
Mizuho is the main protagonist who transfers to an all-girls school per his grandfather's will and must crossdress in order to attend. He already looks very androgynous, so the change thankfully is not obvious to the other members of the school. However, Mizuho is always nervous about being found out and constantly worries that it will happen. In spite of this, he was well received on his first day at school and has already become very popular among the students. At first he was shocked when he found out about the will, but with the help of his childhood friend and cousin Mariya Mikado, who also attends the school, he was able to resign himself to transferring to the school. He is generally depicted in his school uniform wearing breast prostheses underneath. Throughout the anime, willing suspension of disbelief is employed, as there are severally scenes where Mizuho shows cleavage (such as when he is trying on bikinis), despite the fact that he does not have breast implants.

When Mizuho was younger, he had very little self-confidence and in effect often would follow Mariya around, depending on her as his closest childhood friend. Additionally, his mother died from an unexplained illness when he was younger and one of her last requests to her husband, Mizuho's father, was to not force Mizuho to have his hair cut until after he had grown up. Mizuho explains this was so that he would be free to make his own choice of what hairstyle he wanted later on, and obviously he kept it, thinking it suited him best.

The Kaburagi family's biggest rival is the Itsukushima family, both of which are very well-endowed in terms of money and power. Mizuho did not realize it at first, but Takako is a member of that Itsukushima family. Despite this, Mizuho doesn't see her as a rival and enjoys her company very much. In fact, they share world history class together and sit next to each other. They often talk to each other during class by either whispering or passing notes.

Chris Beveridge of Mania Entertainment has noted that Mizuho is "a bit too female in form and movement", wondering if the animators forgot that Mizuho "is really a guy". Erica Friedman of Yuricon regarded the presentation of Mizuho as being "a perfect (i.e., straight/normal) man *and* a perfect woman, at the same time", and noted that his false breasts were portrayed as being warm and realistic to the touch.

Mizuho's episodes such as October revolution at Seio Girls' Academy, Relay race in the sports meeting and so on are handed a story down from generation to generation.

Mizuho enters Shōyō University after his graduation. Mizuho, Shion and Takako often visit Seio Girls' Academy.

 (video game), Miyu Matsuki (anime)
Shion is one of Mizuho's classmates who figures out that he is a boy after only their second meeting, but tells him that she will keep it a secret from anyone else. She tends to have a silent demeanor and voice which helps to give her an appealing appearance to the rest of the students. During the previous year she had to leave school for a while soon after she was elected as the Elder due to illness and had to spend time in the hospital. She has returned to school and is repeating the year she lost even though she still is not fully recovered, as she will pass out if she exerts herself too much. She becomes an adviser and a female role-model for Mizuho.

In Shion's path in the game she is engaged to Kazutaka Itsukushima, who is Takako's older brother. The Itsukushima family is upstart, and so Takako's father arranged the engagement to Shion in order to enhance his family's standing since the Jujo family was once an aristocratic (Kōshaku (侯爵)) family. Takako asks Mizuho to rescue Shion from the Itsukushima family.

Shion enters Shōyō University or a college attached to Seio Girls' Academy after her graduation.

 (video game), Masumi Asano (anime)
Mariya is Mizuho's cousin-german who grew up with him and therefore knows him very well. When it was decided that Mizuho would transfer to the all-girls school she also attends, she took it upon herself to transform him into a beautiful girl by the use of makeup, and she seemed to have a lot of fun dressing him up.

Mariya has a very spirited personality which often helps her to make sure Mizuho is acting feminine in every way: appearance, mannerisms, and even speech. This often includes using mild violence. She has difficulty in controlling her temper which sometimes causes her to do inadvisable things or carry grudges, such as her grudge against Takako, to an extreme. For most of the time that Mariya has known Mizuho, she has always been there as his support whenever he needed her, though later on in the series she finds that without her even realizing it, he has already managed to stand on his own in terms of self-confidence and maturity. Initially, she is very uneasy about this change and is unsure on how to act towards Mizuho after this revelation. She also realizes that she has developed feelings for Mizuho, something she had not consciously been unaware previously. Mariya is in the track and field club and she has been given the epithet Matsurika no Kimi.

She goes abroad to study in United States after her graduation.

 (video game), Ayano Matsumoto (anime)
Yukari is one of the first-year students at the school who lives in the same dormitory building as Mizuho and Mariya, who also is her onee-sama; it is a tradition for the underclassmen to serve their respective senpai in any way they can. Much like Kana and Mariya, she is a very energetic girl, although unlike them, she is deathly afraid of ghost stories and anything scary - a fact which Mariya has often used for her own amusement and which initially caused some trouble when Yukari met Ichiko. Yukari is on the track and field team along with Mariya, though her main reason for joining was due to her older sister-in-law who had urged her to come to this school and who was also in track and field. Yukari soon comes to discover that she really does like for track and field and continues to participate in club activities even when she loses her self-confidence in other matters.

Later she becomes the student council president and the captain of the track and field club, and her another name is Kohaku no Kimi at Seio Girls' Academy. Incidentally, in her path, she retires from the club just before Mizuho's graduation and she begins to study earnestly so that she will enter the same university as him.

Voiced by: Ayaka Kimura (video game), Akemi Kanda (anime)
Kana is another one of the girls who lives in the same dormitory building as Mizuho, who becomes her . Kana is more than happy to serve Mizuho in any way she can, since she admires him immensely. Kana, who like Yukari, is a first-year student, has been waiting for the chance to have an onee-sama as she has always been envious of Yukari having Mariya to fill that role. One of the defining features about her is that she often ends sentences with the phrase ~na no desu yo (roughly, "it's the case that...").

Kana wears a large pink ribbon in her hair which was given to her by the director of the orphanage she lived at for much of her life. Ultimately, the director, who loved Kana as a daughter, died right after giving her the ribbon and due to this, she almost never takes the ribbon off. Kana has never seen her mother's or father's faces. She comes to the school on an academic scholarship made possible by her own efforts because the ribbon gives her strength of mind.

Kana is in the drama club. Despite being very nervous on the stage, but she is selected for the leading role at the school festival by Kei, who is the director of the club. The play is favorably received. She subsequently plays many of the main roles in future productions and is called Shoragiku no Kimi at Seio Girls' Academy. Kana later becomes the director of the drama club and the seventy-fourth elder sister. She enters a university and joins a theatrical company after her graduation.

 (video game), Chiaki Takahashi (anime)
Takako is the student council president of the all-girls school where the story takes place. She tends to have a serious personality which complements that of a student council president. As the president, she knows that she must be very decisive in her actions, since she knows the students would have trouble following her if she did not act so. In private, Takako herself has stated how she almost never has confidence in herself.

In contrast to her usual attitude, she has also shown a more gentle side to her character. Eventually, she begins to develop feelings and falls in love with Mizuho. As she is still under the belief that Mizuho is a girl, this confuses her. She also has a great fear of ghosts. She also hates frogs, the result of a childhood 'prank' pulled by Mariya in the anime version.

Takako was previously invited to join the track and field team during the same time that the elections for new student council members were being held. Although she was not opposed to the idea of joining the track and field team she ultimately declined their offer and was elected to the student council. Mariya, who was in the Track and Field Club at the time, thought that her response was unforgivable and has carried a grudge against Takako ever since. The truth of the matter was that Takako could not handle both the track and field and student council activities simultaneously, though Mariya could never accept this as the truth.

Takako goes to Shōyō University after her graduation.

 (video game), Yuko Goto (anime)
Ichiko is, in fact, a ghost. Her story begins 22 years ago: a previous Elder (who later became Mizuho's mother) had a close relationship with an underclassmen who had a weak body. The underclassman was hospitalized but desperately wanted to see her Elder so she snuck out of the hospital, went to the Elder's room to wait for her. Unfortunately she died before she had the chance to talk with the Elder. That room has been deemed a "closed room" ever since, until Mizuho arrived and started living in it, in accordance with his grandfather's will.

She is very energetic and hyperactive, often talking very quickly. It took some time for her to understand that she is a ghost, and by that token, dead. She notes that Mizuho looks very much like her previous Elder love interest. Although she can touch people, she cannot pick up objects and she slips through walls. Incidentally, in the anime version, she is not able to make contact with everyone. Invisible barriers initially prevent her from leaving the dorm, but she is able to leave the building as long as she is touching Mizuho in anime version, and her movable range extends to the entire school grounds after a certain event in video game.

In the video game, she has a capacity for spirit possession and it helps Mizuho's critical phase.

Supporting characters

 (video game), Yui Sakakibara (anime), Mei Misonoo (Futari no Elder)
Hisako is Mizuho's 3-A homeroom teacher and one of the few people in the entire school, other than Mariya, the headmistress, the deputy head teacher (video game version) and later Sion and Ichiko, who knows that Mizuho is in fact a boy. She has a helpful personality and told Mizuho to come to her if anything was bothering him. She often gives out candy to her students.

In the video game version, she was previously a student of Seio Girls' Academy, but she had to transfer to another school because of her father's job. She returned to become a sister and a teacher at the school because of Shiori's death after she transferred. She later resigned from her post to become a novelist and wrote a novel about her memories of Shiori under the pen name Hisa Kamimura. She has returned to the school at principal Sawe's request and is acting as both Chihaya's homeroom teacher and the acting principal of the school while Sawe is undergoing medical treatment.

Voiced by: Hikaru Isshiki (PC), Rie Kugimiya (PS2/PSP), Kei Shindō (anime)
Kei is a strange girl in Mizuho's class who usually has a quiet voice and doesn't show much emotion. She is the director of the drama club and during times on stage she has to be very forceful in order to get a good response out of her actors. A character with the same name and similar appearance, appears in another one of Caramel Box's other games, Alicematic.

Voiced by: Hina Kamimura (PC), Yukari Fukui (PS2/PSP), Sakura Nogawa (anime)
Michiko is also in Mizuho's class and is a good friend of Kei's as they are constantly seen hanging out together. Unlike Kei, Michiko usually has a smile on her face and is a fairly social person.

Voiced by: Junko Kusayanagi (PC), Tsugumi Higasayama (PS2/PSP), Madoka Kimura (anime)
Kimie is a treasurer of the student council and as such, she follows Takako around most of the time. When they are not together, Kimie goes around investigating various matters and reports back to Takako. Much like Takako, she has a very serious personality and always supports Takako when need be.
She becomes the student council president for the next term in Takako's path. She is the seventy-third elder sister and her another name is Kaguya no Kimi.

Voiced by: Furi Samoto (PC), Ryōka Yuzuki (PS2/PSP)
Shiori was Hisako's kōhai at Seio Girls' Academy during Hisako's school days. She was good at the piano and was a scholarship student of the music class at the school. She does not appear in the anime version.

Voiced by: Hitomi Aoi (video game), Mami Horikoshi (anime)
Sawe is a sister and the principal at Seio Girls' Academy. She admitted Mizuho to the school knowing that he is a boy.

Voiced by: Yuki Matsunaga (video game), Ayano Matsumoto (anime)
Youko is the student council vice-president at the school. She becomes the student council vice-president, or the president depending on the route chosen by the player. She is called Mikado no Kimi in the third grade.

Voiced by: Ayaka Kimura (video game), Kanda Akemi (anime)
Kanako, is in same grade as Yukari and Kana, and is the secretary of student council in the first grade and second grade, and the vice-president in the third grade. She speaks slowly.

Voiced by: Hikaru Isshiki (video game)
Kayano is the head of the flower arrangement club in video game.

Voiced by: Hina Kamimura (video game), Mikako Satō (anime)
Sachiho, who was Mizuho's mother, died of illness during Mizuho's childhood. She was an Elder at the school twenty two years previously, and had a close relationship with Ichiko.

Voiced by: Hideyuki Tanaka (PC-CD/PS2/PSP)
Yoshiyuki is Mizuho's father and the president of the Kaburagi financial group.

Mitsuhisa is Mizuho's grandfather. His will makes Mizuho transfer to Seio Girls' Academy.

Voiced by: unvoiced (PC-CD/PS2/PSP), unpublished (PC-DVD), Yoshikazu Nagano (anime)
Hisaishi is Mizuho's grandfather's family lawyer. He informs Mizuho and  Mariya of the surprising contents of their grandfather's will.

Soichiro is Takako's father. He is the president of Itsukushima group which has seen very rapid growth in the past ten years due to his outstanding ability and efficiency. Takako hates him because he keeps mistresses and he neglected his home life. Her name appears on Otoboku and its sub episodes.

, 
Voiced by: unpublished (video game)
Norika and Miwa are apathetic members of the track and field club. On Mariya's advice they retire from the club. Since then a rumor that Mariya forced them to retire has started to spread.

Isako is a veteran teacher who has taught at Seio Girls' Academy since Hisako's school days. She works her students hard in odd jobs. Her name appears on Otoboku and Futari no Elder.

Sub-episodes and drama CDs

Voiced by: Erena Kaibara (Yarukibako/PS2/PSP), Sanae Kobayashi(drama CD of anime version)
Kaede is a maidservant at the Kaburagi (Miyanokouji) House. She was raised in the same orphanage as Kana. She has lived at Kaburagi House for the past 15 years and has acted as Mizuho's foster mother since he lost his mother in childhood. She is in her mid- to late twenties two years after Mizuho's graduation. She later marries Mizuho's father.

Voiced by: Yui Sakakibara (drama CD of video game version)
Nao is Mariya's junior in the track and field club, and she has feelings for Mariya. Her nickname is Cosmos no Kimi.

 (drama CD of anime version)
Tsubaki is a middle-aged woman, who claims to be a witch, whom Mizuho meets when he and his friends visit a summer house. In fact, she is a famous chef and she teaches him how to cook.

Momoko is the vice-president of the university student council where Mizuho, Sion and Takako enroll. She speaks in a Kansai dialect. She is 145 centimeters tall and she doesn't like her childish figure. She appears in Yarukibako2.

Otome wa Boku ni Koishiteru: Sakura no Sono no Étoile
This novel is a sequel to Takako's path on video game. It begins a month after Mizuhos' graduation. Main protagonists are Kana Suoin, Yukari Kamioka, Kaoruko Nanahara and Hatsune Minase. Kaoruko and Hatsune are new students, they enter the dormitory and Kana and Yukari become their onee-sama in the dormitory. Kimie Sugawara, Youko Kadokura and Kanako Ukitsu, who are supporting characters in Otoboku, are also focused. Mizuho Miyanokouji, Sion Jujo, Takako Itsukushima and Mariya Mikado in Otoboku, and Makiyo Shingyouji, Kayleigh Glanzelius and Sayoko Ukitsu in Futari no Elder appear as supporting characters. Other supporting characters are the following:

Midori is the director of the drama club in succession to Kei when Kana is the second grade.

Hibiki called Siren no Kimi is the director of the school PA club. She and Kana are finalists of the election of the seventy-fourth elder sister; She hands over her votes to Kana because she adores Kana. And so Kana becomes the seventy-fourth elder sister.

Otome wa Boku ni Koishiteru: Futari no Elder

Main characters 

 (PC), Ao Takahashi (PSP), Yū Shimamura (OVA)
Chihaya is the main protagonist. He is a boy who transfers to an all-girls school from an all-boys school. He became alienated from his father and he distrusts people, especially males. Due to his gentle character and his feminine looks, a nasty prank was done to him by another student in the all-boys school. This traumatized him and he then refused to go to school. His mother ordered him to enter into the Seio Girls' Academy.
He uses the surname Kisakinomiya, his mother's maiden name, in order to enter into the school. Mariya and Mizuho are his cousins. He is acquainted with Mizuho, but he doesn't like him. Because he has been compared to Mizuho who is excellent; his feeling for Mizuho has changed while he hears episodes in Mizuho's school days.
His grandmother on his mother's side came from Northern Europe and he is gray-haired due to the atavism. He behaves himself like a lady perfectly and he is good at studies and sports. His looks, talents, and personality draws the focus of attention of all the students at Seio, and he becomes the seventy-fifth elder sisters with Kaoruko.

 (PC), Saki Nakajima (PSP), Eri Kitamura (OVA)
Kaoruko is one of main characters in Sakura no Sono no Étoile and another main protagonist of Futari no Elder. She has a rough personality because her mother died in her infancy and her father brought up her all by himself. Her father operates consumer credit, her family had the misfortune of being broken up by borrowed money by the company, and she has held a grudge towards her classmates before entering Seio Girls' Academy.
Her onee-sama is Kana in the dormitory building. Kaoruko and Kana is called reverse sisters because she is 170 centimeters in height and Kana is short. She has a 3-dan in kendo and she is called Knight no Kimi after winning the fencing against an ace of fencing club; Kana's onee-sama Mizuho instructs her in fencing before the match.
She's often lost in admiration of a beauty, and Chihaya's smile charms her at the first time in the dorm. She has complex for her femininity. She ask Chihaya instruct her in it. She knows Chihaya is a male because of Junichi's notice, but she supports Chihaya. She becomes the seventy-fifth elder sisters with Chihaya.

 (PC), Kiyomi Asai (PSP), Sayuri Hara (OVA)
Fumi is one year under Chihaya and Kaoruko. The Watarai family has worked under the Kisakinomiya family for generations, therefore Fumi is Chihaya's and his mother Taeko's maid.
She goes to the school before Chihaya's transfer, and she enters the dormitory building with him. She is loyal to Chihaya and always gives top priority to him. She makes tenants in the dormitory allow to service him any way by her.
She seldom betrays her feelings. But she becomes so silent while her bad mood, and even Chihaya finds it difficult to restore her good humor.
She is well informed about the machine. She often get some machines from pals on the Internet.

 (PC), Kaori Mizuhashi (PSP), Megumi Takamoto (OVA)
Kayleigh, is one year under Kaoruko, calls herself a star princess. Her father is an Asian, her mother comes from North Europe, and She has brown skin, brunette hair and emerald green eyes. She has no experience of school life till entrance into the school, so she leads to friction in the school.
She understands is a non-standardized student in the school and she enjoys it; She played a mysterious girl in the first grade and intends to be feminine student without manful way of speaking in the second grade.
She is good at horoscope. She joins the swim club by her own fortune.

 (PC), Yoshino Nanjō (PSP), Hisako Kanemoto (OVA)
Awayuki, is Kayleigh's classmate, is a blonde-haired girl and she has a little empathy with Chihaya. She likes reading books. She neglects her studies and she is buried in her books despite the dates of tests.
Her parents are masters of flower arrangement, they and Utano's parents belong to the same school of flower arrangement. She joins the flower arrangement club in the school. She has rivalry with Chihaya in flower arrangement.
She is never content and she has built up a strong sense of rivalry against the Chihaya because of his good skill in flower arrangement.
Utano is her closed friend, Utano calls her "Yuki-chan", and she calls Utano "Ucha-chan" in private. But she calls Utano Gozen in public because Utano is very popular in the school.

 (PC/PSP), Yuiko Tatsumi (OVA)
Utano, is one year under Chihaya, is the president of the flower arrangement club. She often visits the gardening club because she likes gardening.
Her parents discipline her strictly and she grants it beyond a doubt. But she wants freedom at the bottom of her heart.
She has elegant movements. Other students call her Gozen meaning 'Her Highness' and she often gives someone advice. She is much talked of as the next elder sister. Utano is attached to Chihaya because he doesn't give her special treatment.
Her path exists in PC version.

 (PC), Akane Tomonaga (PSP), Ayana Taketatsu (OVA)
Kaori, is the same grade with Kaoruko, entered the dormitory building in the middle of her second grade.  She is on friendly terms with members in the dorm, however she has a poor reputation in the school and other students keep her at a distance.  She looks quite mature for her age in mental development.  However she enjoys teasing her closed friends.
She is a yuri and she enjoys a secret meeting with some lower grade students.
Though she spots Chihaya for a male, she keeps it a secret from the other students and she supports him.
Her path exists in PC version.

 (PC), Ai Shimizu (PSP), Mana Hirata (OVA)
Yuu is a new student in the school. Her onee-sama is Hatsune in the dormitory building. She has a weak constitution. She strives for rehabilitation while she develops rapport with Hatsune and Chihaya, and she gets better little by little. She calls Tenshi-sama meaning angel for Chihaya. Her path exists in PSP version.

 (PC/PSP), Risa Kayama (OVA)
In Sakura no Sono no Étoile, Hatsune, is same grade with Kaoruko, enters the dormitory building. Her parents went to New York because of her father's job, but she stays in Japan. She is timid and she is a little afraid of Kaoruko at first.
Her onee-sama is Yukari in the dorm. She joins the track and field club due to an admiration for Yukari. There is a trouble that resulted from Yukari's devoted coaching for her in the club; The current captain resigns from the post and the captain designates Yukari as to the successor. Kimie decided to nominate Yukari for the student council president because of that trouble and Hatsune joins the student council.
In Futari no Elder, she becomes the student council president in succession to Yukari and a finalist for the seventy-fifth elder sister. Her path exists in PSP version.

Supporting characters 

 (PC/PSP), Ai Matayoshi (OVA)
Hinata is new student in the school. She enters the dormitory building because her mother remarried and she makes her mother and new father enjoy newly married life for three years. Her onee-sama is Kaori in the dormitory building. She joins the liberal arts club and she writes a script for a drama at the school festival.

 (PC), Naoko Takano (PSP)
Sayoko, is same grade Hatsune, is Kanako's younger sister, but she is crisp. She is a treasurer of the student council in the second grade and is the vice-president in the third grade.

 (PC), Kei Mizusawa (PSP)
Sae, is same grade with Kaoruko, is the director of the science club. She makes coffee with vacuum coffee maker made of laboratory equipments like a laboratory flask for visitors. She talks with poor feelings.

 (PC), Nami Kurokawa (PSP), Emi Yamamoto (OVA)
Makiyo is a classmate of Kaoruko and Chihaya. She called ōji-sama meaning prince is a popular person. Her new closed frand Kaoruko and Kiyora are envied by other for a while. Her emotional ups and downs are large, and she ignore even her closed friends while she is in bad mood.

 (PC), Kimiko Koyama (PSP), Yūko Mori (OVA)
Kiyora is a classmate of Kaoruko and Chihaya. She has some younger brothers, she is a good housekeeper and she is better than her mother in housekeeping. She is 149 centimeters tall and she is particular about her child looks.

 (PC/PSP)
Sakura, is same grade with Fumi, is a secretary of the student council. She is called Tsutchii by Yayako.

 (PC), Midori Hirayama (PSP)
Yayako, is a new student, is a treasurer of the student council. She is called Yaya-pyon by Sakura.

 (PC), Aiko Ōkubo (PSP), Satomi Akesaka (OVA)
Eri is Fumi's classmate and Fumi's friend.

 (PC), Kanoko Inada (PSP)
Kaho is Fumi's classmate and Eri's closed friend.

 (PC), Tomoko Hasegawa (PSP)
Shinako, is same grade with Chihaya and Kaoruko, is the head of the gardening club.

 (PC), Yuka Nishiguchi (PSP)
Koyori, is a classmate of Chihaya and Kaoruko, is the captain of the volleyball club.

 (PC), Maki Kobayashi (PSP), Yoriko Nagata (OVA)
Harumi is one year behind Kaoruko. Her father is the president of a company borrowed lots money from a finance company operated by Kaoruko's father.

 (PC), Ema Kogure (PSP), Rika Sasa (OVA)
Reika, is one year behind Kaori, is the vice-director of the drama club. She is a playmate of Kaori.

 (PC)
Jun is Kayleigh's classmate. She consults with Kaori about love.  She appears in PC version.

 (PSP)
Seika is a classmate of Kayleigh and Awayuki. She tells fortune with tarot cards, and the divination became a fad among students by her fortune-telling. She appears in PSP version.

 (PC/PSP)
Kyouko is the head of a roll book at Chihaya's class.

 (PC/PSP)
Karina is a receptionist at Kaori's class.

 (PC/PSP)
Sachiko is the president of library committee.

 (PC/PSP)
Youko is a Awayuki's classmate.

 (PC/PSP)
Minao is same grade with Kaoruko. She is one of victims of continual robberies.

Keika is the captain of the fencing club.

Others 

 (PC), unpublished (PSP), MAKO (OVA)
Chitose is Chihaya's twin sister. She died of a disease that identical twins are susceptible to at ten years old. She took care of Chihaya during her lifetime. She appears as a ghost and she supports him.

 (PS/PSP), Yuka Saitou (OVA)
Taeko, Chihaya's mother, makes Chitose transfer to Seio Girls' Academy from which she graduated. She forgot Chitose because her daughter Chitose's death affected her mind. She is doted upon by Chihaya after that.

Kunihide, Chihaya's father, is on bad terms with Chihaya. He resigned himself to becoming a diplomat because he wanted to marry Taeko who is an only daughter of Kisaraginomiya family; Kisaraginomiya family has been work as diplomat for generations, and Taeko's father wanted that Kunihide followed Kisaraginomiya family tradition.

 (PC), Atsushi Ishimoto (PSP)
Kouzou is Mariya's father, Kunihide's older brother and Chihaya's uncle. He is very anxious about relations between Chihaya and Kunihiko.

Kiyoka is Mariya's mother and Yoshiyuki's younger sister. She is an alumna of Seio Girls' Academy.

 (PC), Takayuki Kondō (PSP)
Jun'ichi is Kaoruko's bodyguard. He spots Chihaya for a male at a glance. He lost his family by family suicide in the past on account of his parents' bad debt from consumer credit operated by Kaoruko's father Genzou. He is reconciled with Genzou now and Genzou trusts him to guard Kaoruko.

 (PC), Kiyoshi Katsunuma (PSP)
Genzou is Kaoruko's father. He operates the major consumer credit named NJF finance. His daughter Kaoruko was slandered by classmate before her entering Seio Girls' Academy because he is notorious for a miser. Though he is a warm-hearted person in fact, He devotes himself solely to cruel thing on his business.

Shizuka who is Kaoruko's mother died soon after Kaoruko was born.

 (PC/PSP)
Shinya is a bodyguard of the Nanahara family.

 (PC/PSP)
Masaji is Fumi's great-grandmother and the matriarch of Watarai family. Fumi was hammered selfless devotion to Fumi's master by Masaji.

 (PC), Keisuke Nakamura (PSP)
Katsuya is Kaori's guardian. He is Kaori's real father, but he does not acknowledge her. He is a master calligrapher.

 (PC/PSP)
Touko, who is Kaori's mother, died. She was a geisha at a hanamachi.

Notes and references

Otome wa Boku ni Koishiteru
Characters